A list of films produced in Argentina in 1994:

External links and references
 Argentine films of 1994 at the Internet Movie Database

1994
Argentine
Films